The 1924 United States presidential election in Nevada was held on November 4, 1924 as part of the 1924 United States presidential election. State voters chose three electors to the Electoral College, who voted for president and vice president.

Nevada was won by President Calvin Coolidge (R–Massachusetts), running with Senator Charles G. Dawes, with 41.76% of the popular vote, against Senator Robert M. La Follette Sr. (I–Wisconsin), running with Senator Burton K. Wheeler, with 36.29% of the popular vote. Democratic nominee John W. Davis came third, although Ormsby County was the westernmost county in the nation to give him a plurality of its ballots.

Results

Results by county

See also
United States presidential elections in Nevada

Notes

References

Nevada
1924
1924 Nevada elections